An essential patent or standard-essential patent (SEP) is a patent that claims an invention that must be used to comply with a technical standard.  Standards organizations, therefore, often require members disclose and grant licenses to their patents and pending patent applications that cover a standard that the organization is developing.

If a standards organization fails to get licenses to all patents that are essential to complying with a standard, owners of the unlicensed patents may demand or sue for royalties from companies that adopt the standard. This happened for example to the JPEG standard.

Determining which patents are essential to a particular standard can be complex. Standardisation organizations require licences of essential patents to be on fair, reasonable, and non-discriminatory (FRAND) terms.

See also 
 Patent ambush, a situation where a member of a standards organization withholds information about patents they own during development of a proposed standard and subsequently claims them to be relevant to the standard as adopted.
 Patent map
 Patent thicket
 Orange-Book-Standard

References

Further reading and viewing 
 "Potential Antitrust Liability Based on a Patent Owner's Manipulation of Industry Standard Setting", Proceedings of ABA Antitrust Section Spring Meeting (2003) by Janice M. Mueller.
 "Patent Misuse Through the Capture of Industry Standards", 17 Berkeley Tech. L.J. 623 (2002) by Janice M. Mueller.
 

Patent law
Standards